Enoggera Barracks (also known as Gallipoli Barracks) is an Australian Army base in the northwestern Brisbane suburb of Enoggera in Queensland, Australia. It was officially established in the early 20th century when the area was used for field training, although the area was used by military units as far back as the mid-19th century. Since then it has been developed into a modern military base, which is now home to units of the 7th and 11th Brigades as well as the headquarters of the 1st Division and the 16th Aviation Brigade.

History

The base has a long history, having been in existence officially since 1908, although the wider area has been used for military purposes since 1855. Upon its establishment, the camp consisted of four paddocks that were used for training and drill—Bell, Fraser's, Rifle and Thompson's—and a number of rifle ranges were established there for use by civilian groups and units of the militia. Since then the base facilities have been expanded as the Army's presence there has grown through its involvement in the two world wars and other conflicts.

On Anzac Day (25 April) 1990, it was renamed Gallipoli Barracks.

The base is home to the majority of 7th Brigade units. With the reorganisation of 7th Brigade in 2007, there are also a couple of units from the 11th Brigade based at Enoggera. It is one of the largest army bases in the country.

In January 2011, the base was the location of the headquarters for the Australian Defence Force's response to the 2010–11 Queensland floods, Operation Queensland Flood Assist.The base facilities underwent a $770 million expansion, which raised the number of regular personnel based at Enoggera to about 5,600 in 2014. The upgrade included redeveloping the 7th Brigade's headquarters as well as construction of a new gym, an indoor pool and training centre, and an expansion of 8th/9th Battalion's lines, and new lines for 2CER and other units.

The Royal Australian Regiment Memorial Walk is located on the base.

Current units
Formations
HQ 1 DIV (DJFHQ)
HQ 7 BDE
HQ 16 BDE (Aviation)

Royal Australian Armoured Corps
2nd/14th Light Horse Regiment

Royal Australian Artillery
1st Regiment
105th Medium Battery (This unit was formerly a field artillery unit until 2005)
20th Regiment
131st Surveillance and Target Acquisition Battery
132nd Unmanned Aerial Vehicle Battery
Combat Service and Support Battery

Royal Australian Engineers
2nd Combat Engineer Regiment
6th Engineer Support Regiment
1st Topographic Survey Squadron
21st Construction Squadron

Royal Australian Corps of Signals
1st Signal Regiment (DJFHQ/1DIV)
101 Signal Squadron
7th Combat Signal Regiment (7BDE)
139 Signal Squadron
140 Signal Squadron
136 Signal Squadron (Fixed/Strategic)

Royal Australian Infantry Corps
6th Battalion, Royal Australian Regiment
8th/9th Battalion, Royal Australian Regiment
9th Battalion, Royal Queensland Regiment
25th/49th Battalion, Royal Queensland Regiment

Royal Australian Army Medical Corps
Gallipoli Barracks Health Centre
2nd General Health Battalion
7th Combat Service Support Battalion
Army Malaria Institute
Area Health Services — South Queensland

Australian Army Band Corps
8/9 Battalion Royal Australian Regiment Pipes and Drums
Australian Army Band — Brisbane
Royal Australian Artillery Band — Brisbane

Royal Australian Corps of Military Police
D Coy, 1 MP Battalion

Australian Army Cadets
Headquarters South Queensland Australian Army Cadets Brigade
129 Army Cadet Unit

Heritage listings 
The base has a number of heritage-listed sites, including:

 Inwood Road: Enoggera Magazine Complex
 431 Lloyd Street: School of Musketry
 Murray Avenue: Small Arms Magazine
 Wynter Road: Remount Complex

See also 

 List of airports in Queensland

Notes

References

External links

 3rd Battalion The Royal Australian Regiment Corporation

Buildings and structures in Brisbane
Barracks in Australia
Airports in Queensland
Enoggera, Queensland
1908 establishments in Australia
Military installations in Queensland